Percy John Ramster, better known as P.J. Ramster, was an Australian film director. He also ran an acting school, and his students often appeared in his films.

One of his students was Paulette McDonagh who, along with her sisters, hired Ramster to direct their first film, but removed him during production and Paulette took over.

Another one of Ramster's students was William Shepherd, who later went on to become one of the leading editors in Australia.

He worked for a time as an actor.

Filmography
High Heels (1918) – short
Should Girls Kiss Soldiers? (1918) – short
Jasamine Freckel's Love Affair (1921) – short
Mated in the Wilds (1921)
The Tale of a Shirt (1922) – short
The Triumph of Love (1922)
Should a Doctor Tell? (1923)
Cattiva Evasione, aka or A Naughty Elopement (1923) – short
The Rev. Dell's Secret (1924)
Those Who Love (1926)
Should a Girl Propose? (1926)
The Russell Affair (1928)

References

External links
P.J. Ramster at National Film and Sound Archive

Australian film producers
Year of birth missing
Year of death missing